Labidosa is a genus of moths belonging to the subfamily Tortricinae of the family Tortricidae.

Species
Labidosa ochrostoma (Meyrick, 1918)
Labidosa sogai Diakonoff, 1960

See also
List of Tortricidae genera

References

External links

tortricidae.com

Archipini
Tortricidae genera